Dharma Raja is a 1980 Indian Tamil-language film, directed by M. A. Thirumugam and produced by Chinna Annamalai. The film stars Sivaji Ganesan, K. R. Vijaya, K. Balaji and Major Sundarrajan. It was released on 26 April 1980, and ran for over 100 days in theatres.

Plot

Cast 
Sivaji Ganesan as Dharma Raja
K. R. Vijaya
K. Balaji
Major Sundarrajan
Thengai Srinivasan
Manorama
Pushpalatha
Geetha

Soundtrack 
The soundtrack was composed by M. S. Viswanathan, while the lyrics were penned by Kannadasan. The song "Vanavillai Polirukkum" attained popularity.

Reception 
Kanthan of Kalki lauded Viswanath Rai's cinematography.

References

External links 
 

1980 films
1980s Tamil-language films
Films directed by M. A. Thirumugam
Films scored by M. S. Viswanathan